Menninger is a surname. Notable people with the surname or its variant Meningerg include:

Johann Matthias Menninger (1733–1793), Austrian actor
Karl Augustus Menninger (1893–1990), American psychiatrist
Karl Menninger (1898–1963), German teacher of and writer about mathematics
William Claire Menninger (1899–1966)
Roy W. Menninger (born 1926), MD
W. Walter Menninger (born 1931), MD
William Meninger, Trappist monk and author
Thalia Menninger, the gold-digging dream girl in the CBS situation comedy series The Many Loves of Dobie Gillis (1959-1963)

See also
 The Menninger Clinic, a specialty psychiatric and behavioral hospital located in Houston, Texas
the Menninger Foundation, a foundation in Topeka, Kansas, established 1941